Eugen Vodă (born 14 January 1964) is a Romanian former footballer who played as a goalkeeper.

Honours
ASA Târgu Mureș
Divizia B: 1986–87, 1990–91
Universitatea Craiova
Cupa României: 1992–93, runner-up 1993–94

Notes

References

1964 births
Living people
Romanian footballers
Romania under-21 international footballers
Association football goalkeepers
Liga I players
Liga II players
Faroe Islands Premier League players
ASA Târgu Mureș (1962) players
FC U Craiova 1948 players
Skála ÍF players
Romanian expatriate footballers
Romanian expatriate sportspeople in the Faroe Islands
Expatriate footballers in the Faroe Islands
Sportspeople from Târgu Mureș